The Royal Australian Navy (RAN) fleet is made up of 38 commissioned warships and 6 non-commissioned .

The main strength is the eight frigates and three destroyers of the surface combatant force: eight Anzac class frigates and three Hobart class destroyers. Six Collins-class boats make up the submarine service, although due to the maintenance cycle not all submarines are active at any time. The issues have now been fixed and five submarines are available for service. Amphibious warfare assets include two Canberra-class landing helicopter dock ships and the landing ship . Eight Armidale-class patrol boats perform coastal and economic exclusion zone patrols, and four Huon-class vessels are used for minehunting and clearance (another two are commissioned but in reserve since October 2011, for sale as 2018). Replenishment at sea is provided by two Supply-class replenishment oilers, while the two Leeuwin-class and two Paluma-class vessels perform survey and charting duties.

In addition to the commissioned warships, the RAN operates the sail training ship Young Endeavour and five Cape-class patrol boats. Other auxiliaries and small craft are not operated by the RAN, but by DMS Maritime, who are contracted to provide support services.<ref name=SaundersPhilpott35>Saunders & Philpott (eds.), IHS Jane's Fighting Ships 2015–2016, p. 35</ref>

The lion's share of the RAN fleet is divided between Fleet Base East (in Sydney) and Fleet Base West (near Perth).

Submarines
Collins class

Australia operates a single class of diesel-electric submarines, the six Collins-class boats which began entering service in 1993. The Collins was designed by the Swedish submarine builder Kockums as the Type 471 specifically to meet Australian requirements, many of which were derived from Australia's need for great range without utilizing a nuclear propulsion system. The boats themselves were built in Australia by the Australian Submarine Corporation in Adelaide. The submarines are classified by the RAN as guided missile submarines (SSG), but are often referred to as hunter-killer submarines (SSK) in the international press. While these vessels represented a major increase in capability for the RAN, they have found themselves mired in numerous technical and operational problems. Meanwhile, the RAN has struggled to sufficiently crew their submarine fleet, with at times no more than two qualified crews available. The Collins was to be replaced by twelve Shortfin Barracudas a conventionally-powered design of the Barracuda-class nuclear submarine by French shipbuilder Naval Group that had been selected in 2016 and named the Attack-class. In September 2021, in a joint announcement, it was announced that the Attack-class contract had been cancelled, and that Australia would acquire up to eight nuclear-powered submarines with US and UK support through a new trilateral security pact between Australia, the UK and the US named AUKUS. The entire Collins-class fleet will now receive a Life-of-Type Extension.

{| class="wikitable" width=90% style="text-align: center"
|- bgcolor=lavender
! Size !! Performance !! Armament !! Other features
|-
|valign=top width=20%| Displacement:3051 t surfaced3353 t submergedLength: Complement: 58
|valign=top width=30%| Submerged speed:Surfaced speed:Surfaced range:Submerged range:
|valign=top width=30%| 6 × 21-inch (533 mm) torpedo tubes, firing:Mark 48 Mod 7 CBASS torpedoes,UGM-84C Sub-Harpoon anti-ship missiles, or Stonefish Mark III mines
|valign=top width=20%| Sonars:Scylla, SHORT-TASRadar:Type 1007Periscope:CK043, CH093
|}

Amphibious warfare

Canberra class

The hull of each ship was built by the designer, Navantia, then was transported to Australia by heavy lift ship for internal fitout and installation of the superstructure by BAE Systems Australia. Designed to transport and land an amphibious force of up to 1,600 soldiers by landing craft and helicopter, the Canberras are the largest ships ever operated by the RAN. Lead ship  was commissioned into the RAN in late 2014. The second ship of the class, was commissioned at the end of 2015.

Choules

The Bay-class landing ship dock  was acquired by the RAN in 2011. The ship was originally built by Swan Hunter for the British Royal Fleet Auxiliary, and entered British service in 2006 as RFA Largs Bay. She was made redundant in the 2011 Strategic Defence and Security Review and sold to Australia. Choules represents a major increase in sealift capability for the RAN, particularly after mechanical issues in 2010 and 2011 forced the early retirement of the navy's two Kanimbla-class vessels, and put  in dock for an extensive refit.

Surface combatants

Hobart Class 

Australia operates a single class of Air Warfare Destroyers (AWD). The Hobart class AWD are based on the Spanish Navantia F100 frigate and incorporate an Aegis Combat System with an AN/SPY-1D(V)phased array radar. These combined with the SM-2 missile provide an advanced air defence system capable of engaging enemy aircraft and missiles at ranges in excess of 150km.

Anzac class

There are eight frigates of the Anzac class. These were commissioned from 1996 to 2006 as part of a joint program with New Zealand, whose navy operates an additional two examples. Derived from Blohm + Voss' MEKO modular ship family and designated the MEKO 200 ANZ by that company, the ships were built in Australia by Tenix in Williamstown, Victoria. They are designated as helicopter frigates (FFH) by the RAN, and are designed to be capable of both mid-level patrol and blue water operations. In 2010, these vessels began to receive upgrades to their anti-ship missile defence (ASMD) capabilities.

Patrol and defence

Armidale class

For patrol of Australia's vast coastline, territorial waters, and offshore territories, the RAN operates nine Armidale-class patrol boats. These replaced the Fremantle class from 2005 as the navy's primary asset for border protection, fisheries patrols, and interception of unauthorised arrivals by sea. Based on the Bay-class customs vessels, the Armidale'''s are significantly enlarged to allow for better range and seakeeping ability. Originally, twelve boats were to be built by Austal, but the establishment of a dedicated patrol force for the North West Shelf Venture saw another two ordered.  was decommissioned in December 2014 after being extensively damaged by an onboard fire. Ongoing problems with the patrol boats, including wear from high operational use and structural issues, prompted the RAN to acquire two Cape-class patrol boats from the Australian Border Force.

Huon class

Mine countermeasures at sea are handled by the Huon-class minehunters, which began to enter RAN service from 1999. The class was based on the Italian Navy's Gaeta-class minehunter developed by Intermarine. Development was undertaken in partnership between Intermarine and Australian Defence Industries (ADI). The first hull was built in Italy, with fitting out the first and construction of the remaining five vessels of the class done by ADI in Newcastle, replacing the problematic Bay-class minehunters. In addition to the mine warfare role, individual have been deployed on occasion to support patrol and border protection operations. An additional two ships were placed in reserve in October 2011.

Replenishment
Supply class

Two Supply class replenishment ships were ordered from Navantia back in 2016 to replace the RAN's ageing replenishment vessels HMAS Success and HMAS Sirius. The ships are designed to provide fuel, food, ammunition, and other stores to RAN vessels operating well beyond friendly ports. The two ships began commissioning in 2021.

Hydrographic survey
Leeuwin class

Two Leeuwin-class survey ships were built for the RAN by NQEA of Cairns. Ordered in 1996, the ships were commissioned in a joint ceremony in 2000. In addition to hydrographic surveying duties, since 2001 both vessels have also operated in support of the RAN patrol force.

Paluma class

The Paluma-class survey motor launches are large catamarans designed for survey operations around northern and eastern Australia. Four ships were built by Eglo Engineering at Port Adelaide, South Australia between 1988 and 1990. The vessels normally operate in pairs.

Non-commissioned vessels
Young Endeavour

The Sail Training Ship Young Endeavour was built as a gift from the United Kingdom to Australia for the latter's 1988 bicentenary of colonisation. Built by British shipbuilder Brooke Marine, the brigantine rig vessel is operated by the RAN, but is used to facilitate the Young Endeavour Youth Scheme; a sail training program for Australian youth aged between 16 and 23. A 10-strong RAN crew is supplemented by 24–30 youth on ten-day voyages, with 500 applicants selected every year through two ballots.

Cape class

Eight Cape-class patrol boats were built for the Australian Customs and Border Protection Service (now the Australian Border Force) by Austal between 2012 and 2015, as replacements for the Bay class.
2 new boats were ordered on 2017 and the 2 leased were returned to the ABF.

National Support Squadron

In addition to commissioned ships, the RAN is supported by the National Support Squadron which is made up of vessels operated by Teekay Shipping Australia and crewed mainly by civilian mariners. The force comprises:
MV Besant (Submarine support)
MV Mercator (Navigational training vessel)
MV Sycamore (Aviation training vessel)
MV Stoker (Submarine support)
ADV Ocean Protector (Border protection)
ADV Reliant (Pacific support vessel)

See also
 List of Defence Maritime Services vessels
 List of Royal Australian Navy bases
 List of Royal Australian Navy ships

References
 Citations

 Bibliography
 
 
 
 

 
Navy, active
Australia
Ships,active.